The 49th Street Theatre (later renamed Cinema 49) was a Broadway theater at 235 West 49th Street in the Theater District of Manhattan in New York City. The 750-seat neo-Renaissance style theater was designed by the architect Herbert J. Krapp for the Shubert Organization. It opened on December 26, 1921, with a performance of Face Value, a comedy by Laurence Grass. Although it had some popular productions, such as the revue La Chauve-Souris and the Aaron Hoffman play Give and Take, the venue was one of the Shuberts' less successful locations. They lost control of the property during the Great Depression. It continued to operate as a playhouse until April 1938. The final theatrical performance at the venue was a production of Henrik Ibsen's The Wild Duck. The venue was then converted to show movies and reopened as Cinema 49. The cinema was also unsuccessful and closed in 1940; the building was demolished in December of that year.

References

External links
 
 

1921 establishments in New York City
1940 disestablishments in New York (state)
Buildings and structures demolished in 1940
Cinemas and movie theaters in Manhattan
Former Broadway theatres
Former cinemas in the United States
Demolished buildings and structures in Manhattan
Demolished theatres in New York City
Shubert Organization
Theater District, Manhattan
Theatres completed in 1921